Henry George Smoker (1 March 1881 – 7 September 1966) was an English all-round sportsman, who played football for Southampton and first-class cricket for Hampshire. He played minor counties cricket for Cheshire.

Football career
Smoker was born at Hinton Ampner, near Alresford, Hampshire, the son of George Smoker who had played cricket for Hampshire in the 1880s.

Henry signed for Southampton of the Southern Football League in the close-season of 1900, but spent most of his career at The Dell in the reserves. Described as "a speedy left-winger who favoured taking on the full-back rather than delivering the early cross", Smoker eventually made his first-team debut over three years after joining the "Saints" when he took the place of the injured Dick Evans for the match against Wellingborough Town on 7 November 1903.

His only other appearance for Southampton came on 2 January 1904; Evans was now out with a serious leg injury and trainer Bill Dawson had tried to fill the vacancy at outside-left, firstly with John Fraser and then Harry Turner, before settling on Joe Turner, with Southampton going on to claim their sixth, and last, Southern League championship.

In the summer of 1904, Smoker decided to quit professional football to concentrate on his cricket career.

Cricket career
He made his first-class cricket debut for Hampshire in a County Championship against Lancashire at United Services Recreation Ground, Portsmouth in May 1901.

He developed into a useful lower-order left-handed batsman but was mainly a right-arm medium-fast bowler. His most prolific season was in 1907, when he played eleven matches, scoring 125 runs and taking 31 wickets at an average of 19.41. His best bowling came against the touring team from South Africa, at the County Ground, Southampton in June 1907, when he claimed 7 wickets for 35 runs in South Africa's first innings, as the tourists were dismissed for a total of 82 runs. Hampshire scored 111 in reply, but the visitors had reached 329 for nine at the end of the second day, before rain caused the match to be abandoned as a draw.

His best score with the bat came against Kent at the Angel Ground, Tonbridge in the same month, when he scored 39 not-out in Hampshire's first innings, as Hampshire reached a total of 292 runs. Kent replied with 596 runs, with 204 from James Seymour and 101 for Kenneth Hutchings. Hampshire managed only 114 in their second innings, with Smoker scoring a "duck" – thus Kent won the match by an innings and 190 runs.

Smoker then moved to Cheshire and continued to turn out for Cheshire County Cricket Club in Minor Counties cricket from 1909 to 1925.

From 1930 to 1960, he was groundsman and cricket coach at Birkenhead School.

Family
His brother-in-law was Victor Norbury, who also played cricket for Hampshire and football for Southampton.

References

External links

1881 births
1966 deaths
People from Alresford
English cricketers
Hampshire cricketers
Cheshire cricketers
English footballers
Association football forwards
Southampton F.C. players
Southern Football League players